The claw-snouted blind snake (Anilios unguirostris) is a species of snake in the Typhlopidae family.

References

Anilios
Reptiles described in 1867
Taxa named by Wilhelm Peters
Snakes of Australia